The Rivière des Roches is a river on the Indian Ocean island of Réunion. It flows northeast from the centre of the island, reaching the sea close to the town of Bras-Panon. The Rivière des Marsouins follows a largely parallel course, reaching the sea three kilometres to the south.

References

Rivers of Réunion
Rivers of France